PTC Integrity Lifecycle Manager (formerly MKS Integrity) is a software system lifecycle management (SSLM) and application lifecycle management (ALM) platform developed by MKS Inc. and was first released in 2001. The software is client/server, with both desktop (java/swing) and web client interfaces. It provides software development organizations with a collaborative environment in which they can manage the end-to-end processes of development, from requirements management, engineering change management, revision control, and build management to test management and software deployment, as well as associated reports and metrics.

Overview
MKS Integrity is now a PTC product since the acquisition of MKS Inc., which was completed on May 31, 2011, by PTC.

PTC Integrity Lifecycle Manager (Integrity LM or ILM) allows software development teams to track all aspects of their work, including work items, source control, reporting, and build management, in a single product. 
The product consists of two components—Integrity Configuration Management and Integrity Workflow & Documents. The Configuration Management part of PTC ILM is used to handle source code versions, branches, etc. It is based on client-server architecture. The Java client doesn't store any management data on a local system. Therefore any task performed on source files requires a network connection.
This means that, unlike distributed systems, this system requires a reliable network connection, enough network bandwidth, and enough processing power on the server side. The other component (Workflow & Documents) consists of an Issue tracking system, as well as a Requirement- and Test Managementsolution.

One of the strengths compared to other similar solutions is PTC Integrity's flexibility in terms of workflows, fields, presentation layout, validation, and automation capabilities. PTC Integrity Lifecycle Manager is based on Java and uses a JavaScript extension for reporting. Any interaction can be performed online, in the command-line interface, or utilizing the server or client Java API.

PTC Integrity Lifecycle Manager is built around a single repository. This single-repository solution supports the three pillars of lifecycle management—traceability, process automation, and reporting and analytics and some companies may see additional value in this approach.

Integration of PTC Integrity Lifecycle Manager with IDEs and other development tools is—out-of-the-box—limited to a few products. Supported IDEs include Eclipse and Visual Studio. Also supported are IBM i and Apache Maven.

PTC Integrity Lifecycle Manager Solutions 
When installing PTC Integrity LM, you will get a full set of functionality in the Configuration Management part. To allow you to work with Workflow & Documents, you can install a solution component. The following solutions are available (in the release order):
 ALM Solution
 Medical Solution
 Agile Solution
 Systems Engineering Solution (SysEng)
ALM and Agile are single solutions. The SysEng solution consists of both components integrated, and additionally also Risk Management (3 more document types). 

A solution provides the following elements: 
 Item and Document Types 
 States and Workflows 
 Reports
 Charts
 Dashboards
Every solution component can be tailored or enhanced to fulfill your individual process requirements.

PTC Integrity as Product Group 
In 2015, PTC defined a software product group using the name "PTC Integrity". This group contains also former Atego products, such as
 PTC Integrity Lifecycle Manager (former MKS Integrity),
 PTC Integrity Modeler (Atego Modeler),
 PTC Integrity Process Director (Atego Process Director), and
 PTC Integrity Requirements Connector (Atego Requirements Synchronizer™).

History
PTC Integrity Lifecycle Manager was previously known under different brands, including MKS Source, MKS Integrity Manager, Implementer (for IBM i), and others. These were consolidated under a single brand, with the release of MKS Integrity 2007 in July 2007, which was acquired by PTC and finally renamed PTC Integrity in 2011. PTC retired the Integrity brand and rebranded Integrity to Windchill starting in July 2019.

References

External links
PTC Integrity
Integrity Blog
PTC User Community Portal

Version control systems
Proprietary version control systems
Software project management
Agile software development